The 2008–09 Premier Soccer League season (known as the ABSA Premiership for sponsorship reasons) was the thirteenth since its establishment. Supersport United were the defending champions, having won their first Premier Soccer League title on the final day of the previous season. The campaign began in August 2008, ended in May 2009. A total of 16 teams contested in the league, 14 of which contested in the 2007–08 season, and two of which were have been promoted from the National First Division.

Season summary

Supersport United defended their title to win their second consecutive Premiership title. Orlando Pirates came close to taking the title in the final game. Both teams were tied at the top of the points table with 55 points each. Supersport United had a greater goal difference with 23 goals over Orlando Pirates's 17 goals.

Bay United were relegated to the National League after finishing at the bottom of the table on 21 points. Thanda Royal Zulu will go into a playoff with teams from the National League to determain if they will retain their place in the PSL or be relegated to the National League after ending 15th on the league table with 33 points.

Bloemfontein Celtic survived relegation on goal difference, ending 14th on the league table with 33 points. They were tied with Thanda Royal Zulu, but their goal difference were greater than that of Thanda Royal Zulu.

Clubs

Ajax Cape Town
AmaZulu
Bay United
Bidvest Wits
Bloemfontein Celtic
Free State Stars
Golden Arrows
Kaizer Chiefs
Mamelodi Sundowns
Maritzburg United
Moroka Swallows
Orlando Pirates
Platinum Stars
Santos
Supersport United
Thanda Royal Zulu

Promotion and relegation

Pre-Season
Teams promoted from 2007–08 National First Division
 Champions (Coastal Stream): Maritzburg United
 Play-offs: Bay United

Teams relegated to 2008–09 National First Division
 Last on PSL: Black Leopards
 Play-offs: Jomo Cosmos

Post-Season

 Champions of the Inland Stream Jomo Cosmos took on Champions of the Costal Stream Carara Kicks in a two leg playoff for promotion to the Premier Division.
 The first leg of the play-off saw the match end in a goalless draw at the Charles Mopeli Stadium on 7 May 2009.
 The second leg of the play-off saw Jomo Cosmos win Carara Kicks 2 – 1 at Vaal Technikon on 10 May 2009 to see Jomo Cosmos promoted to the Premier Division.
 Thanda Royal Zulu who finished 15th on the Premier Division table will go into a mini play-off tournament with Carara Kicks (who lost their play-off match with Jomo Cosmos), Mpumalanga Black Aces (who finished second in the Inland Stream) and F.C. Cape Town (who finished second in the Costal Sream).
 Carara Kicks will face Mpumalanga Black Aces and Thanda Royal Zulu will face F.C. Cape Town
Teams promoted from 2008–09 National First Division
 Champions (Inland Stream) Jomo Cosmos
 Play-offs: Mpumalanga Black Aces

Teams relegated to 2009–10 National First Division
 Last on PSL:  Bay United
 Play-offs: Thanda Royal Zulu

League table

Results

PSL Awards

Teko Modise was the biggest winner at the annual Premier Soccer League awards dinner on 24 May 2009 at Gold Reef City Casino, pocketing a whopping R400 000 after he was named Footballer of the Year and Players' Player of the Year.

It was the second time that the Orlando Pirates midfielder bagged the coveted Footballer of the Year honour, following his controversial win last season. This time, however, Modise's brilliance from the unusual left of midfield position helped Pirates mount a championship bid.

Lucas Thwala, who earlier this month was named Pirates' Player of the Season ahead of Modise, was named the Premiership Player of the Year.

Ajax Cape Town's Franklin Cale won the award for the Telkom Knockout Player of the Tournament.

Statistics

Top goalscorers
As of May 23, 2009

19 goals
  Richard Henyekane (Golden Arrows)

16 goals
  Mabhuti Khenyeza (Ajax Cape Town)

10 goals
  Luis Rentería (Platinum Stars)
  Surprise Moriri (Mamelodi Sundowns)
  Anthony Laffor (SuperSport United)
  Bernard Parker (Thanda Royal Zulu)
  Sthembiso Ngcobo (Free State Stars)

9 goals
  Dumisani Ngwenya (AmaZulu)
  Katlego Mashego (Orlando Pirates)
  Gert Schalkwyk (Bloemfontein Celtic)
  Bradley Ritson (AmaZulu)

8 goals
  Elias Pelembe (SuperSport United)
  Lucas Thwala (Orlando Pirates)
  Nkosinathi Nhleko (SuperSport United)
;

PSL managers

Kits 2008–2009

Dec 2008/Jan 2009 Transfer Window

References

External links
Premier Soccer League (PSL) Official Website
RSSSF competition overview

2008-09
2008–09 in African association football leagues
1